Klein Belitz is a municipality  in the Rostock district, in Mecklenburg-Vorpommern, Germany.

Sons and daughters 
 Carl Freiherr von Langen (1887-1994), German equestrian

References

Grand Duchy of Mecklenburg-Schwerin